Bogusław Julian Schaeffer (also Schäffer) (6 June 1929 – 1 July 2019) was a Polish composer, musicologist,  and graphic artist, a member of the avantgarde "Cracow Group" of Polish composers alongside Krzysztof Penderecki and others.

Schaeffer was born in Lwów (now Lviv, Ukraine). After studying violin in Opole and graduating in musical composition under Zdzisław Jachimecki in 1953 at the Academy of Music in Kraków, he became an active composer and musical theoretician. From 1963, he was a lecturer on composition at the Kraków Academy, and he was a professor at the Hochschule für Music in Salzburg from the mid-1980s to 2000.

Konstancja Kochaniec was one of his students.

Schaeffer's 'Klavier Konzert' was used on the soundtrack of David Lynch's 2006 film Inland Empire. "Solo", a documentary about Schaeffer was released in 2008.

In 2022, american electronic music duo Matmos released an album dedicated to composer.

Awards 
 1959 - 2nd Prize at the Grzegorz Fitelberg Competition in Katowice for Monosonata for 24 solos string instruments
 1962 - Prize at the Artur Malawski Competition in Kraków for Musica ipsa
 1964 - 2nd Prize at the Fitelberg Competition for Little Symphony
 2007 - Grand cultural award of the province of Salzburg

Most significant works

Books 
 New Music. Problems in Contemporary Composing techniques (Nowa Muzyka) - 1958
 Introduction to Composition (1974)

Musical works

Orchestral works 
 Quattro Movimenti for piano and orchestra - 1957
 Topofonica for 40 different instruments - 1960
 Musica ipsa for orchestra - 1962
 Music for MI for vibraphone and orchestra - 1963
 Collage and Form for 8 jazz musician and orchestra - 1963
 Collage for orchestra - 1964
 Text for orchestra - 1971
 Warsaw Overture for orchestra - 1975
 Stabat Mater for sopran, alt, string orchestra and orgeln - 1983
 Missa Sinfonica for orchestra - 1986

Concertante 
 4 Movimenti for piano and chamber orchestra - 1957
 Concerto Breve for cello and orchestra - 1959
 Concerto for flute, flute trio and orchestra - 1963
 Violin Concerto - 1963
 Piano Concerto II for piano and orchestra - 1967
 Jazz Concerto for 12 musicians and orchestra - 1969
 Concerto for 3 pianos - 1972
 Concerto for guitar and orchestra - 1984
 Concerto for 2 piano 4 hands and orchestra - 1988
 Violin Concerto II - 1989
 Piano Concerto III for piano, orchestra and electronic media - 1990
 Concerto for Viola and Orchestra - 1997
 Piano Concerto IV for piano, orchestra and electronic media - 1999
 Violin Concerto III for violin and orchestra - 1999
 Violin Concerto IV for violinist with 3 violins and chamber orchestra - 2003
 Piano Concerto V for piano and 15 vocalists - 2004
 Piano Concerto VI for piano and 11 instruments (including accordion) - 2004
 Concerto for Viola and Chamber Orchestra - 2004
 Piano Concerto VII for piano and chamber orchestra - 2005
 Violin Concerto V for violin and female chorus - 2006

Chamber music 
 Music for string quartet - 1954
 Permutations for 10 instruments - 1956
 String Quartet No.1 - 1957
 Extremes for 10 instruments - 1957
 Monosonate for 6 string quartets - 1946
 Lineare Construction for piano - 1959
 Kodes for chamber orchestra - 1961
 String Quartet No.2 - 1964
 Composition for harp and piano - 1966
 Estratto for string trio - 1971
 String Quartet No.3 - 1971
 Mare for piano and 9 instruments - 1971
 Negative Music for chosen instrument - 1972
 Free Form I for 5 instruments - 1972
 Iranian Set for flute, piano, 3 actors & ensemble of performers - 1976
 Minimal Art for tuba and piano - 1977
 Gravesono for wind instrument - 1977
 Self-expression for violoncello - 1978
 Kesukann for 13 string instruments - 1978
 Esatto e libero for violin and piano - 1983
 Mouhadatsa for viola and violoncello - 1985
 Kwaiwa for violin and computer - 1986
 Summer Music for accordion and piano - 1987
 Missa brevis for choir - 1988
 Spring Music for viola and piano - 1988
 Winter Music for horn and piano - 1988
 Love Moments - 1990
 Monophonie II for 13 violas - 1997
 Kreuzweg 11 for saxophone, accordion, percussion and viola - 2003
 Salzburg Spectres for 4 violas - 2005
 Quartet for 4 violas - 2006
 String Quartet No.17 - 2006

Solo works 
 Sonate for violin solo - 1955
 Negative for flute solo - 1960
 Construction for vibraphone solo - 1962
 Project for tuba and tape - 1980
 Euterpe for oboe solo - 1984
 Sonata for viola solo - 1991
 Espedozione for trombone solo - 2000
 Per Violino Solo - 2002
 Raccontino for marimba solo - 2005

Keyboard works 
 Sonatine - 1952
 Composition - 1954
 Model I-XXXIV - 1956-2006
 Described Emotions - 1966
 Sonate II for organ - 1985
 Sonate III-IV for organ - 1986
 Megasonata for piano - 1994
 Fantasia (24 movements) for organ - 2003
 Fantasie Impromptu for piano - 2004
 Grand Sonata for piano solo and electronic media - 2006

Opera 
 Monodram, opera radiowa, 65' - 1968
 Liebesbliecke opera, 150' - 1990

See also 

 Regards/Ukłony dla Bogusław Schaeffer, 2022 experimental electronic album by Matmos sampled from Schaeffer's complete works

References

External links 
 Bogusław Schaeffer at culture.pl
 Bogusław Schaeffer at the Polish Music Center
 work by Bogusław Schaeffer
 musicaustria
 polmic

1929 births
2019 deaths
Musicians from Lviv
20th-century classical composers
21st-century classical composers
Academic staff of the Academy of Music in Kraków
Polish classical composers
Polish male classical composers
Polish music critics
Polish opera composers
Academic staff of Mozarteum University Salzburg
20th-century male musicians
21st-century male musicians